Cock and ball torture (CBT), occasionally known as penis torture, dick torture, or male genitorture/male genital torture, is a sexual activity involving the application of pain or constriction to the penis or testicles. This may involve directly painful activities, such as genital piercing, wax play, genital spanking, squeezing, ball-busting, genital flogging, urethral play, tickle torture, erotic electrostimulation, kneeing or kicking. The recipient of such activities may receive direct physical pleasure via masochism, or emotional pleasure through erotic humiliation, or knowledge that the play is pleasing to a sadistic dominant. Many of these practices carry significant health risks.

Devices and practices 

Similar to many other sexual activities, CBT can be performed using toys and devices to make the penis and testicles more easily accessible for attack, or for foreplay purposes.

Ball stretcher

A ball stretcher is a sex toy that is used to elongate the scrotum and provide a feeling of weight pulling the testicles away from the body. This can be particularly enjoyable for the wearer as it can make an orgasm more intense, as testicles are prevented from moving up. Intended to make one's testicles permanently hang much lower than before (if used regularly for extended periods of time), this sex toy can be potentially harmful to the genitals as the circulation of blood can be easily cut off if over-tightened.

While leather stretchers are most common, other models consist of an assortment of steel rings that fastens with screws, causing additional but only mildly uncomfortable weight to the wearer's testicles. The length of the stretcher may vary from 2.5–10 centimeters (about 1–4 inches). A more dangerous type of ball stretcher can be home-made simply by wrapping rope or string around one's scrotum until it is eventually stretched to the desired length.

Ball crusher
A ball crusher is a device made from either metal or often clear acrylic that squeezes the testicles slowly by turning a nut or screw. How tight it is clamped depends on the pain tolerance of the person it is used on. A ball crusher is often combined with bondage, either with a partner or by oneself.

Parachute
A parachute is a small collar, usually made from leather, which fastens around the scrotum, and from which weights can be hung. It is conical in shape, with three or four short chains hanging beneath, to which weights can be attached.

Used as part of cock and ball torture within a BDSM relationship, the parachute provides a constant drag, and a squeezing effect on the testicles. Moderate weights of 3–5 kg can be suspended, especially during bondage, though occasionally much heavier weights are used. Smaller weights can be used when the participant wearing it is free to move; the swinging effect of the weight can restrict sudden movements, as well as providing a visual stimulus for the dominant partner.

Humbler

A humbler is a BDSM physical restraint device, a cock-and-ball bondage toy used to restrict the movement of a submissive participant in a BDSM scene. It consists of a testicle cuff device, typically a ring, that clamps around the base of the scrotum while it is drawn back between the legs. This is mounted in the center of a bar or pair of rods that pass behind the thighs at the base of the buttocks. As a result the wearer is forced to keep their legs folded forward, as any attempt to straighten them even slightly pulls hard on the scrotum, causing anything from considerable discomfort to extreme pain. In this way the wearer is prevented from standing up straight and has to stay bent over or crawl on all fours.

Testicle cuffs
A testicle cuff is a ring-shaped device that can be placed around the scrotum between the body and the testicles. When it is closed it prevents the testicles from passing through. A common type of testicle cuff consists of two connected cuffs, one around the scrotum and the other around the base of the penis. Testicle cuffs are one of the many devices that are used to restrain the male genitalia. A standard padlock, which cannot be removed without its key, may also be locked around the scrotum.

Some passive participants enjoy the feeling of being "owned", while dominant individuals enjoy the sense of "owning" their partners. Requiring such an individual wear testicle cuffs symbolizes that their sexual organs belong to their partner. There is a level of erotic humiliation involved, through which they find sexual arousal. The cuffs may also form part of a sexual fetish of the wearer or their partner.

However, these are extreme uses of testicle cuffs. More conventionally, the device pulls down the testicles and keeps them there during stimulation, which has a number of benefits:

 Making the penis appear longer. Pulling the testicles down and away from the base of the penis stretches the skin over the base of the penis and pubic bone, exposing the additional few centimetres of penile shaft that is normally hidden from view.
 Improving sexual arousal. While some participants may be aroused by the feeling of being "owned", the physical feeling of stretching the ligaments that suspend the testicles has an effect similar to the more common practice of stretching one's legs and pointing the toes.
 Preventing the testicles from lifting up so far that they become lodged under the skin immediately adjacent to the base of the penis, a condition which can be very uncomfortable, especially if the testicle is then squashed by the slap of skin during thrusting in sexual intercourse.
 Delaying or intensifying ejaculation by preventing the testicles from rising normally to the "point of no return". It is much harder to reach an orgasm.

Cock harness

A cock harness is a penile sex toy designed to be worn around the penis and scrotum. Its function is similar to that of a cock ring. These devices are often associated with BDSM activities. The Gates of Hell is a male chastity device made up of multiple cock rings that can be used for CBT. Kali's Teeth is a metal bracelet with interior spikes that closes around the penis and can be used for preventing or punishing erections. Leather penis sheaths lined with internal spikes can be used for similar purposes.

Ball busting 

"Ball busting" is the practice of kicking or kneeing participants in the testicles. It carries several medical risks, including the danger of testicular rupture from blunt trauma.

CBT in Japan 
Tamakeri (玉蹴り) (lit. ball kicking) is a sexual fetish and subgenre of BDSM within which a man's testicles are abused. The genre is also referred to as ballbusting ("bb" for short). Tamakeri is the Japanese term, but it is used by many non-Japanese people to describe media where Asian people—mainly women—are participating in it. The dynamics of tamakeri consist of a masochist having their testicles hurt by a sadist. The fetish is popular among heterosexual and homosexual men and women.

Denkianma (電気按摩) (lit. "electric massage") is a popular Japanese prank played between two people where one person puts their foot into the genital area of the other and shakes it in a vibrating motion. Often this is done by grabbing the other person's feet, raising them, and then placing one's own foot on their crotch and vibrating it. This is often done between school aged boys as a prank similar to kancho and could be seen by a western audience as a type of bullying. In 2006, Frito Lay released a special, Taitsukun-themed edition of Doritos chips, that referenced denki anma.

Safety 

Loss of blood flow is one of the greatest risks in cock and ball torture and may cause irreversible damage. Bleeding is an indicator of unsafe behavior. Because numbness may result from circulation problems in the affected member, the level of pain is not an indicator of a problem and signs of danger include numbness or loss of color and edemas. Bondage in which the testicles are tied to another object is especially dangerous, increasing the risk of damaging the testicles through excessive tension or pulling.

The most serious injuries are testicular rupture, testicular torsion and testicular avulsion, which are medical emergencies that require urgent medical attention.

See also

 Breast torture
 Chastity cage
 Chastity piercing
 Forced orgasm
 Groin attack
 Penile injury
 Pussy torture
 Small penis humiliation
 Urethral sounding

References

Further reading
 Hardy Haberman, Fetish Diva Midori. The Family Jewels: A Guide to Male Genital Play and Torment. Greenery Press, 2001. .

BDSM activities
Penis
Testicle
Sexual acts
Paraphilias